This is a comprehensive discography of Evidence, a Venice, Los Angeles, California-based  rapper.

Studio albums

Instrumentals tapes
Yellow Tape Instrumentals (2004)
Red Tape Instrumentals (2007)
The Purple Tape Instrumentals (2008)
Green Tape Instrumentals (2013)
Squirrel Tape Instrumentals, Vol. 1 (2019)

Mixtapes
Storm Watch Mixtape (2007)
The Layover Mixtape (2008)
I Don't Need Love (Evidence vs. The Beatles) (2010)

EPs
The Layover EP (2008)

Evidence-produced projects

 The Medicine (2006) (with Planet Asia)
 After the Fact (2013) (with LMNO)
 A Whole New Cook EP (2016) (with CookBook)
 The Darkest Hour (2017) (with Madchild)
 Rare Poise (2017) (with Defari)
 Aren't U Glad You're U? (2018) (with Domo Genesis)
 Secrets & Escapes (2019) (with Brother Ali)
 Rule of Thirds (2021) (with Planet Asia)
 Intros, Outros & Interludes (2022) (with Domo Genesis)

Singles

Guest appearances
 Red Foo & Dre Kroon - "The Freshest" from Balance Beam (1997)
 Defari - "Focused Daily" from Focused Daily (1998)
 Joey Chavez - "Reservation For One" from After The Heat (1998)
 The High & Mighty - "Top Prospects" from Home Field Advantage (1999)
 Swollen Members - "Counter Parts" from Balance (1999)
 Swollen Members - "Full Contact" from Bad Dreams (2001)
 Joey Chavez - "People And Places" from The Original Structure (2001)
 Linkin Park - "H! Vltg3" from Reanimation (2002)
 Defari - "Los Angelinos" from Odds & Evens (2003)
 Joey Chavez - "Fingerprints" (2003)
 L.A. Ment - "Undisputables" (2004)
 Lyrics Born - "Pack Up (Remix)" from Same !@$ Different Day (2005)
 F.I.L.T.H.E.E. Immigrants - "Find Us (Remix)" (2005)
 Swollen Members - "So Deadly" and "Dark Clouds" from Black Magic (2006)
 Statik Selektah - "Time to Say Goodbye" from Spell My Name Right: The Album (2007)
 The Away Team - "Sum of Me" from Training Day (2007)
 Jake One - "White Van" from White Van Music (2008)
 Tassho Pearce - "Return to the Basics" (2008)
 Fashawn - "Our Way" from Boy Meets World (2009)
 Alchemist - "Therapy" from Chemical Warfare (2009)
 O.S.T.R. - "Real Game" from O.c.b. (2009)
 DJ Muggs - "Classical" from Soul Assassins: Intermission (2009)
 CunninLynguists - "Running Wild" from Strange Journey Volume Two (2009)
 Rakaa - "Aces High" from Crown of Thorns (2010)
 Statik Selektah - "The Coast" from 100 Proof: The Hangover (2010)
 Strong Arm Steady - "True Champs" from In Search of Stoney Jackson (2010)
 Gangrene - "Wassup Wassup" from Gutter Water (2010)
 Cypress Hill - "Pass the Dutch" from Rise Up (2010)
 7L & Esoteric - "Drawbar 1-2" from 1212 (2010)
 Joe Scudda - "Think About It" from Not Your Average Joe (2010)
 Grimaso - "Movement" from Let The Beat Come True (2010)
 Phonte - "The Life of Kings" from Charity Starts at Home (2011)
 Shuko - "Same Ol Line" from Foundation Vol. 2 Instrumental EP (2011)
 Alchemist - "Never Grow Up" from Russian Roulette (2012)
 Action Bronson - "Bitch, I Deserve You" from Rare Chandeliers (2012)
 Oh No - "Real Serious" from Ohnomite (2012)
 Copywrite - "Golden State (of Mind)" from God Save the King (2012)
 Gangrene - "Dark Shades" from Vodka & Ayahuasca (2012)
 Awar - "Never Break Me" from The Laws of Nature (2012)
 Concise Kilgore - "Teknoir" from Kobain (2012)
 Lirico - "Suave (Smooth Operator)" from Un Antes Y Un Después (2012)
 Roc Marciano - "Love Means" from Marci Beaucoup (2013)
 Durag Dynasty - "Spiral Event" from 360 Waves (2013)
 Statik Selektah - "My Hoe" from Extended Play (2013)
 Notes to Self - "Nobody" from Target Market (Recoil) (2013)
 LMNO - "All Things Pass" from After The Fact (2013)
 Blu - "Can't Stop, Won't Stop" from Good to Be Home (2014)
 Cookbook & Uno Mas - "When You Rock 'n Roll" (2014)
 Diamond D - "It's Magic" from The Diam Piece (2014)
 Apollo Brown - "There's Always Radio" from Grandeur (2015)
 Gangrene - "Just for Decoration" from You Disgust Me (2015)
 DJ Skizz - "Geppetto" from Cruise Control (2016)
 Defari - "Acknowledgement" from Rare Poise (2017)
 Vanderslice - "North American Money" from The Best Album Money Can Buy (2018)
 LMNO, KeyKool & 2Mex - "The Rush" from Blessing In Disguise (2018)
 Domo Genesis - "F#ck A Co-Sign" from Aren't U Glad You're U? (2018)
 Masta Ace - "E.A.T." (2019)
 Brother Ali - "Red" from Secrets & Escapes (2019)
 Statik Selektah - "Soul Custody" from The Balancing Act (2020)

Production

1996 
Various Artists - Old World Chaos (Soundtrack)
04. "Here And There" (Evidence)

1997 
Defari
00. "Bottom Line"
00. "Change & Switch" (feat. Hannibal Faceman)

Dilated Peoples
00. "Global Dynamics"
00. "Third Degree" (feat. Defari)

Swollen Members
00. "Shatter Proof"

Visionaries
00. "Audible Angles"
00. "Bottom Of The Barrel / Live Life (1 Or The Other)"

1998 
Jizzm High Definition - Illasophic Vol. 1
03. "Based On Principle" (feat. Evidence)
07. "Flows Explode"

Of Mexican Descent - Exitos Y Mas Exitos EP
01. "I Am Still"

Rasco - Time Waits for No Man
04. "Bits & Pieces"
05. "Major League" (feat. Defari & Dilated Peoples) (co-produced by Joey Chavez)

Rasco
00. "Major League (Remix)" (feat. Defari & Dilated Peoples) (co-produced by Joey Chavez)

Swollen Members
00. "My Advice"

1999 
Defari - Focused Daily
03. "Never Lose Touch"
04. "Keep It On The Rise"
06. "Bionic"
10. "These Dreams"
12. "Thunder & Lightning" (feat. Tash & Xzibit)
13. "405 Friday's" (co-produced by Defari)
16. "Gems"
17. "People's Choice"

Defari
00. "Cooking Up Your Brain"

Dilated Peoples
00. "Work The Angles (Remix)"

Planet Asia
00. "Place Of Birth"

Swollen Members - Balance
06. "Counter Parts" (feat. Dilated Peoples)
09. "Bottle Rocket" (feat. Divine Styler, Everlast, & Evidence)
17. "Consumption" (feat. Aceyalone)

Various Artists - Defenders Of The Underworld
07. "Skills" (Mr. Brady feat. Evidence)

2011 
Raekwon - Shaolin vs. Wu-Tang
15. "The Scroll"

Swollen Members - Monsters II
04. "Perfect Storm" (feat. Rakaa)

Apathy - Honkey Kong
04. "Check To Check" (co-produced by Khrysis)

Braille - Native Lungs
02. "Feel It"

Evidence - Cats & Dogs
05. "I Don't Need Love" (co-produced by Khrysis)
10. "Late For The Sky" (feat. Slug & Aesop Rock) (co-produced by Sid Roams & Ethan Browne)

2012 
Madchild - Dope Sick
07. "Battleaxe" (feat. Bishop Lamont, D-Sisive, & Dilated Peoples)

Sean Price - Mic Tyson
11. "BBQ Sauce" (feat. Pharoahe Monch) (co-produced by DJ Babu)
13. "By The Way" (feat. Torae)

Fashawn - Champagne & Styrofoam Cups
04. "Stardumb"

2013 
Roc Marciano - The Pimpire Strikes Back 
06. "Take Me Over"

2014 

Step Brothers - Lord Steppington
03. "Byron G" (feat. Domo Genesis & The Whooliganz)

Vince Staples - Shyne Coldchain II
01. "Progressive 3" (co-produced by DJ Babu)
06. "Trunk Rattle" (co-produced by DJ Babu)

A$ton Matthews - Aston 3:16
18. "Mack 11"
19. "Plottin" (feat. Vince Staples)

Dilated Peoples - Directors of Photography
01. "Intro" (co-produced by DJ Babu)
02. "Directors"
04. "Defari Interlude"
05. "The Dark Room" (feat. Vince Staples) (co-produced by Twiz The Beat Pro)
11. "@mrevidence Interlude"
14. "Trouble" (co-produced by Bravo)
17. "Times Squared"

2015 
Madchild - Silver Tongue Devil
03. "Devils And Angels"

2016 
Cookbook & Evidence - A Whole New Cook
01. "A Whole New Cook"
02. "Helen"
03. "TBH" (feat. DJ Babu)
04. "Omaha"
05. "Preachers Of L.A."
06. "Philip Drummond"
07. "Cookbook Got The Answers"
08. "It's On Me" (feat. LMNO & Madchild)
09. "Saturday 2"

Reks - The Greatest X
02. "EgoTrippen" (feat. DJ Heron)

2017 
Madchild - The Darkest Hour
01. "Write It Down"
02. "Imaginary Tears"
03. "Body Bag" (feat. Domo Genesis & Oh No)
04. "Broken Record"
05. "Green Light" (feat. Evidence)
06. "Double Tap" (feat. A$ton Matthews & Fashawn)
07. "Badchild"
08. "Corleone" (feat. Evidence)
09. "Cold Crush"
10. "Club 33" (feat. Step Brothers)
11. "Land" (feat. Illmaculate)
12. "Black And White"
13. "Drama"
14. "All I Know" (feat. Krondon & Evidence)

Tha God Fahim - Dump Legend 2
03. "Bag Lunches"

Tha God Fahim - Tha Ides Of Summer
05. "Night King"

Slaine & Termanology - Anti-Hero
03. "Life Of A Dope Addict" (feat. Catero)

 Souls of Mischief - "Soundscience" from Trilogy: Conflict, Climax, Resolution (2000)
 Swollen Members - "Remember the Name" and "Heat" from Heavy (2003)
 Kanye West - "Last Call" from The College Dropout (2004)
 Visionaries - "Momentum" from Pangaea (2004)
 Tha Alkaholiks - "Handle It" from Firewater (2006)
 Planet Asia - The Medicine (2006)
 Strong Arm Steady - "Streetlights" from Deep Hearted (2007)
 Infamous Mobb - "Music 4 the User" from Reality Rap (2007)
 Heltah Skeltah - "Hellz Kitchen" from D.I.R.T. (2008)
 Włodi - "T&T" from Wszystko z dymem (2013)
 LMNO - After the Fact (2013)

References

General

Specific

External links

Hip hop discographies
Discographies of American artists